Beach Volleyball at the 2010 South American Games in Medellín was held from March 25 to March 28. All games were played at Plaza Mayor in Medellín, Colombia.

Medal summary

Medal table

Men

Group stage

Group A

Group B

Group C

Quarterfinals

Semifinals

Bronze-medal match

Gold-medal match

Women

Group stage

Group A

Group B

Group C

Quarterfinals

Semifinals

Bronze-medal match

Gold-medal match

References

South American Games
2010 South American Games
2010 South American Games